Johnny Firecloud is a 1975 American exploitation horror thriller film directed by William Castleman and starring Victor Mohica, Ralph Meeker, and David Canary. Its plot follows a Native American who, after serving in the Vietnam War, returns to his New Mexico desert hometown to find it victimized by a domineering white rancher, and enacts revenge.

The film was distributed by Twentieth Century-Fox.

Cast

Production
Filming took place in California in the fall of 1974.

Release
The film screened in Albuquerque, New Mexico beginning on July 25, 1975. It later opened in Los Angeles on November 5, 1975.

Something Weird Video released the film on DVD as a double feature with Bummer! in 2001.

See also
 Weird West

References

Sources

External links

1970s exploitation films
1970s thriller films
20th Century Fox films
American splatter films
American thriller films
American vigilante films
Films about Native Americans
Films about veterans
Films set in New Mexico
Films shot in California
Redsploitation
1970s English-language films
1970s American films